Eric Richard Scott is a Canadian filmmaker working in Montreal, Quebec, Canada. He has been working in television and documentary film making since the early 1980s and also works as a researcher for television programs. Scott also runs his own production company, Les Productions des Quatres Jeudis Inc.

Filmography
 Le Rêve américain (1993)
 Voting to Separate (1994)
 Je me souviens (2002)
 Checkpoint: The Battle for Israel's Soul (2003)
 The Other Zionists (2004)
 Leaving the Fold (2008)
 Outremont et les Hasidim (2019)

References
 Montreal Mirror interview with Eric Scott

Film producers from Quebec
Canadian documentary film directors
Film directors from Montreal
Living people
Place of birth missing (living people)
Year of birth missing (living people)
Canadian documentary film producers